The second season of New Zealand reality television series The Block NZ premiered on 26 August 2013 and ended on 4 November 2013. It ran three nights per week, Monday–Wednesday.

The season was set in the Auckland suburb of Belmont, and was judged by Jeremy Hansen, the editor of HOME New Zealand magazine since 2005, and Janice Kumar-Ward, founder of The Recipes in 2008.

Contestants

Episodes

Score history

Winners & Losers

Challenges

Auction results
There was a 3-way tie in the week 10 challenges with Alice & Caleb, Pete & Andy and Loz & Tom all on 6 points. To determine who wins, all the judges scores and challenge wins were added up and determined that Pete & Andy were the most successful team so they got to choose the auction order.

References

2013 New Zealand television seasons